is a Japanese video game developer and publisher, best known for handling emulation of re-released games, such as some Sega Ages titles, Virtual Console titles for Nintendo systems, the 3D Classics series for the Nintendo 3DS and their ShotTriggers  range of classic STG games.
M2 has also created entirely new titles such as WiiWare games for Konami under the ReBirth moniker and more recently a new GG Aleste game.

Games
Publisher in round brackets

Amazon Luna
 Castlevania Anniversary Collection (Konami) 
 Contra Anniversary Collection (Konami)

Arcade
Dengeki Bunko FIGHTING CLIMAX (Sega)
Dengeki Bunko FIGHTING CLIMAX IGNITION (Sega)
 Elevator Action (2014 release) (Taito)
[[Fantasy Zone II#System 16 remake|Fantasy Zone II: The Tears of Opa-Opa (System 16 remake)]] (Sega)Irodorimidori (Sega)
 Koihime Enbu (development assistance) (Unknown Games)
 Rastan Saga (2014 release) (Taito)Skullgirls: 2nd EncoreSenjin Aleste Dedicated Console 
 Game Gear Micro (Sega)
 Sega Genesis Mini (Sega)
 Sega Genesis Mini 2 (Sega)
 TurboGrafx-16 Mini (Konami)

DreamcastFirst Kiss Story II (Broccoli)Sakura Taisen (Sega)

 Game Boy Advance 
 One Piece: Dragon Dream! (Bandai) Di Gi Charat: Di Gi Communication (Broccoli) Di Gi Communication 2: Datou! Black GemaGema Dan! (Broccoli)Game Gear
 GG Aleste 3 Gunstar Heroes (Sega)

Mega Drive/Genesis
Darius (Taito)Darius Extra Version (Taito / Columbus Circle / Strictly Limited Games)Fantasy Zone (Sega)Gauntlet IV (Tengen)Spatter (Sega)Super Locomotive (Sega)Tetris (Sega)VS Puyo Puyo Sun (Sega)

Mega Drive PLUS / Sega Mark VSpace Harrier (Sega)Space Harrier II (Sega)

Mobile
 Ahoge ChanbaraGraffiti Smash (Bandai Namco Entertainment)Karin to Issho! (D3 Publisher)Legend of Mana Remastered (Square Enix)Niruchana! (Kadokawa Shoten)Talking Girls! SECOND (WANIMAGAZINE)Talking Girls! SECOND vol.2 (WANIMAGAZINE)Tenkahyakken -Zan- (Kadokawa)

Nintendo DS
 Fossil Fighters (Nintendo)
 Fossil Fighters: Champions (Nintendo)
 Konami Classics Series: Arcade Hits (Konami)
 Namco Museum DS (Namco Bandai)

Nintendo 3DS
 Game Center CX: 3-Choume no Arino (Bandai Namco Games)
 Lost Heroes (pre-order bonus game) (Bandai Namco Games)
 Lost Heroes 2 (pre-order bonus game) (Bandai Namco Games)
 Virtual Console – Game Gear (Sega)
 The Legend of Dark Witch 3: Wisdom and Lunacy (Flyhigh Works / Circle Entertainment)

3D Classics
 3D After Burner II (Sega)
 3D Altered Beast (Sega)
 3D Ecco the Dolphin (Sega)
 3D Fantasy Zone (Sega)
 3D Fantasy Zone II W (Sega)
 3D Galaxy Force II (Sega)
 3D Gunstar Heroes (Sega)
 3D Out Run (Sega)
 3D Power Drift (Sega)
 3D Puyo Puyo 2 (Sega)
 3D Shinobi III: Return of the Ninja Master (Sega)
 3D Sonic the Hedgehog (Sega)
 3D Sonic the Hedgehog 2 (Sega)
 3D Space Harrier (Sega)
 3D Streets of Rage (Sega)
 3D Streets of Rage 2 (Sega)
 3D Super Hang-On (Sega)
 3D Thunder Blade (Sega)
 Sega 3D Fukkoku Archives (Sega)Sega 3D Classics Collection (Sega)
 Sega 3D Fukkoku Archives 1 & 2 Double Pack (Sega)
 Sega 3D Fukkoku Archives 3: Final Stage (Sega)
 Sega 3D Fukkoku Archives Triple Pack (Sega)

Nintendo Switch8-Bit ADV Steins;Gate (Included with Steins;Gate Elite) (Mages.)ESP Ra.De. Psi (Cave)Mega Man X Legacy Collection (partial) (Capcom)Darius Cozmic Collection (Taito)Final Bubble Bobble (Taito)
 Collection of Mana (Square Enix)
 Castlevania Anniversary Collection (Konami) Contra Anniversary Collection (Konami)Tokyo School Life (PQube)Namcot Collection (Bandai Namco Entertainment)
 Namco Museum Archives (Bandai Namco Entertainment)Darius Cozmic Revelation (Taito, G-Darius HD, G-Darius Ver.2 and Darius (Extra Version) only)Aleste CollectionSuper Momotaro Dentetsu (NES) (Konami)Castlevania Advance Collection (Konami)Power Poke Dash (GBA) (Konami)SEGA Genesis - Nintendo Switch Online (Nintendo)Toaplan Arcade Garage: Kyukyoku Tiger-Heli (Taito)Getsu Fuuma Den (NES) (Konami)Legend of Mana Remastered (Square Enix)Ray'z Arcade Chronology (Taito)Assault Suits Valken DECLASSIFIED (Rainmaker Productions)
Sega Ages

 Sega Ages Sonic the Hedgehog (Sega)
 Sega Ages Sonic the Hedgehog 2 (Sega)
 Sega Ages Thunder Force IV (Technosoft)
 Sega Ages Phantasy Star (Sega)
 Sega Ages Outrun (Sega)
 Sega Ages Gain Ground (Sega)
 Sega Ages Alex Kidd in Miracle World (Sega)
 Sega Ages Puyo Puyo (Sega)
 Sega Ages Virtua Racing (Sega)
 Sega Ages Wonder Boy in Monster Land (Sega)Sega Ages Space Harrier (Sega)Sega Ages Fantasy Zone (Sega)Sega Ages Shinobi (Sega)Sega Ages G-LOC: Air Battle (Sega)Sega Ages Herzog Zwei (Sega)

Web BrowserE-moteWindows
 Sakura Taisen (Sega)
 Mega Man X Legacy Collection (partial) (Capcom)
 Super Bomberman R (Konami)
 Castlevania Anniversary Collection (Konami)
 Contra Anniversary Collection (Konami)
 Koihime Enbu (Unknown Games)
 Koihime Enbu RyoRaiRai (Degica)
 Tokyo School Life Magus Life (Dogenzaka Lab)
 Namco Museum Archives (Bandai Namco Entertainment)Getsu Fuma Den (NES) (Konami)
 Castlevania Advance Collection (Konami)
 Darius Cozmic Collection (Taito)
 G-Darius HD (Taito)Yakuza 0 (retro minigames) (Sega)Yakuza 6: The Song of Life (retro minigames) (Sega)Lost Judgment (retro minigames) (Sega)Legend of Mana Remastered (Square Enix)Bloody Butterfly (Kadokawa)8-Bit ADV Steins;Gate (Included with Steins;Gate Elite) (Mages.)Go Go Nippon ver.2015 (MangaGamer)

PlayStationDoki Doki Poyacchio (Media Rings)

PlayStation 2
 DigiCharat Fantasy Excellent (Broccoli)
 First Kiss Stories (Broccoli/Arcadia Entertainer)
 Oretachi Game Center Zoku: Yie Ar Kung-Fu Sega Ages 2500 Series Vol. 20: Space Harrier II: Space Harrier Complete Collection (Sega)
 Sega Ages 2500 Series Vol. 21: SDI & Quartet: Sega System 16 Collection (Sega)
 Sega Ages 2500 Series Vol. 24: Last Bronx: Toukyou Bangaichi (Sega)
 Sega Ages 2500 Series Vol. 25: Gunstar Heroes: Treasure Box (Sega)
 Sega Ages 2500 Series Vol. 28: Tetris Collection (Sega)
 Sega Ages 2500 Series Vol. 29: Monster World Complete Collection (Sega)
 Sega Ages 2500 Series Vol. 30: Galaxy Force II: Special Extended Edition (Sega)
 Sega Ages 2500 Series Vol. 31: Dennou Senki Virtual On (Sega)
 Sega Ages 2500 Series Vol. 32: Phantasy Star Complete Collection (Sega)
 Sega Ages 2500 Series Vol. 33: Fantasy Zone Complete Collection (Sega)
 Sega Rally 2006 (bonus Sega Rally Championship port) (Sega)

PlayStation 3Akatsuki no Goei Trinity (AKABEiSOFT3/5pb.)Dengeki Bunko FIGHTING CLIMAX (Sega)
 NEOGEO Station (SNK Playmore)
 Capcom Arcade Cabinet (Capcom)DUNAMIS15 (5pb.)
 Koihime Enbu (Unknown Games)Castle of Illusion Starring Mickey Mouse (pre-order bonus for the 2013 remake, Sega Genesis/MD version) (Sega)
Sega Vintage Collection
ToeJam & Earl (Sega)
ToeJam & Earl in Panic on Funkotron (Sega)
Wonder Boy in Monster Land (Sega)
Wonder Boy in Monster World (Sega)
Monster World IV (Sega)
Alex Kidd in Miracle World (Sega)
Revenge of Shinobi (Sega)
Super Hang-On (Sega)
Spelunker Collection (Tozai Games)

PlayStation 4
 Dangun Feveron (Cave)
 Occultic;Nine (development assistance) (Mages.)
 ESP Ra.De. Psi (Cave)
 Battle Garegga Rev.2016 (Raizing)
 Sorcer Striker (Raizing)
 Ketsui: Kizuna Jigoku Tachi (Cave)
Mega Man X Legacy Collection (partial) (Capcom)
 Castlevania Anniversary Collection (Konami)
Contra Anniversary Collection (Konami)
Yakuza 0 (retro minigames) (Sega)
Yakuza 6: The Song of Life (retro minigames) (Sega)
Super Bomberman R (Konami)
 Koihime Enbu RyoRaiRai (Degica)
Namco Museum Archives (Bandai Namco Entertainment)
Darius Cozmic Revelation (Taito, G-Darius HD, G-Darius Ver. 2 and Darius (Extra Version) only)
Aleste Collection
Castlevania Advance Collection (Konami)
Toaplan Arcade Garage: Kyukyoku Tiger-Heli (Taito)
Lost Judgment (retro minigames) (Sega)
Legend of Mana Remastered (Square Enix)
Ketsui Deathtiny -Kizuna Jigoku Tachi-
Ray'z Arcade Chronology (Taito)

PlayStation 5
Lost Judgment (retro minigames) (Sega)

PlayStation Portable
Akatsuki no Goei Trinity (AKABEiSOFT3/5pb.)
BEYOND THE FUTURE – FIX THE TIME ARROWS (5pb.)
DUNAMIS15 (5pb.)
Fight Ippatsu! Juden-chan!! CC (Russel)
GA: Geijutsuka Art Design Class Slapstick WONDERLAND (Russel)
 Gradius Collection (Konami)
 Parodius Portable (Konami)
 ~MIYAKO~ Awayuki no Utage (Idea Factory/Latern Rooms)
 NEOGEO Station (SNK Playmore)
 Shining Hearts (Sega)
 Salamander Portable (Konami)
Tenshin Ranman Happy GO Lucky!! (Russel)
The King of Fighters Collection: The Orochi Saga (SNK Playmore)
 TwinBee Portable (Konami)

PlayStation Vita
Dengeki Bunko FIGHTING CLIMAX (Sega)
 Plastic Memories (development assistance) (Mages.)
 Occultic;Nine (development assistance) (Mages.)
 Yakuza 0 Free Companion App for PlayStation Vita (retro minigames) (Sega)
Spelunker Collection (Tozai Games)

Wii
 Virtual Console – Mega Drive, Master System, MSX, Arcade (Sega)

WiiWare
 Gradius ReBirth (Konami)
 Contra ReBirth (Konami)
 Castlevania: The Adventure ReBirth (Konami)

Wii U
 Virtual Console - Game Boy Advance (Nintendo)

Xbox 360
DUNAMIS15 (5pb.)
 Otomedius G (Konami)
 Mushihimesama Futari (CAVE)
 Capcom Arcade Cabinet (Capcom)
 Bug Princess 2 Ver 1.5 (CAVE)
Sega Vintage Collection
Sega Vintage Collection: Golden Axe (Sega)
Sega Vintage Collection: Streets of Rage (Sega)
Sega Vintage Collection: Monster World (Sega)
Sega Vintage Collection: Alex Kidd & Co. (Sega)
Sega Vintage Collection: ToeJam & Earl (Sega)

Xbox One
 Battle Garegga Rev.2016
 Steins;Gate 0 (handled port) (Mages.)
 Occultic;Nine (development assistance) (Mages.)
 Dangun Feveron
 Mega Man X Legacy Collection (partial) (Capcom)
 Super Bomberman R (Konami)
 Castlevania Anniversary Collection (Konami)
 Contra Anniversary Collection (Konami)
 Namco Museum Archives (Bandai Namco Entertainment)
 Castlevania Advance Collection (Konami)
Yakuza 0 (retro minigames) (Sega)
Yakuza 6: The Song of Life (retro minigames) (Sega)
Lost Judgment (retro minigames) (Sega)

Xbox Series X/S
Lost Judgment (retro minigames) (Sega)

References

External links

Video game companies of Japan
Video game development companies
Video game companies established in 1991
Japanese companies established in 1991